Patrick Burnet Harris (30 September 193426 December 2020) was a Church of England bishop who served in two episcopal positions.

He was educated at St Albans School and Keble College, Oxford. He trained for ordination at Clifton Theological College. He was ordained deacon in 1960 and priest in 1961  and his first post was as a curate at St Ebbe's Church, Oxford after which he became a missionary in South America with the South American Mission Society. He became the Archdeacon of Salta in 1969 before being ordained to the episcopate four years later as Bishop of Northern Argentina.

After seven years he returned to England firstly as Rector of Kirkheaton and Assistant Bishop of Wakefield (1981–1985); and then Secretary of the Partnership for World Mission and Assistant Bishop of Oxford (1986–1988) where he remained until he was appointed Bishop of Southwell, a post he held until his 1999 retirement.

In retirement he served as an assistant bishop in the Diocese of Lincoln (1999–2005), in the Diocese of Gloucester (2005–2017) and in the Diocese in Europe (1999 until his death). He died on 26 December 2020, aged 86.

References

1934 births
2020 deaths
People educated at St Albans School, Hertfordshire
Alumni of Keble College, Oxford
Anglican archdeacons in South America
20th-century Anglican bishops in South America
Anglican bishops of Northern Argentina
Bishops of Southwell
20th-century Church of England bishops